Ka Ina is a Venezuelan telenovela written by César Miguel Rondón and produced by Venevisión in 1995. This telenovela lasted 164 episodes and was distributed internationally by Venevisión International. And was hit, becoming broadcast in countries such as the Philippines, United States, Argentina, Spain, among others.

Viviana Gibelli and Jean Carlo Simancas starred as the main protagonists with Hilda Abrahamz as the antagonist.

Synopsis
Ka Ina tells the story of two women, dangerously linked by superstition, magic and the love of one man. Catalina Miranda and Maniña Yerichana are both beautiful and young. The first is an assertive and independent engineer educated in Europe; the second, the most powerful and feared woman in the jungle, a legendary priestess born to a Dutch gold digger and a Yanomami Indian Princess. Catalina and Maniña will become antagonists because of Ricardo Leon, a mysterious man from the capital city. But there is a fascinating element of magic that makes this rivalry especially interesting. Although they appear to be the same age, Maniña and Catalina are really mother and daughter, a fact that no one knows. A riveting fairy tale filled with ancient folklore and mysterious legends.

Cast

Main
Jean Carlo Simancas as Ricardo Leon/El Chalanero
Viviana Gibelli as Catalina Miranda Funkhütten/Amanaduna
Hilda Abrahamz as Maniña Yerichana
Julio Alcazar as Dagoberto Miranda
Cristina Reyes as Mireya Carvajal #1
Fedra López as  Mireya Carvajal #2
Aroldo Betancourt as Cruz de Jesus/Padre Gamboa

Supporting Cast
Juan Manuel Montesinos as Fernando Larrazabal
Eva Moreno as Tibisay
Alberto Marin as Medardo Garañon
Ramon Hinojosa as Justiniano Garcia
Elisa Escamez as Ingracia Camacho
Jose Torres as Tacupay
Jose Vieira as Antonio Larrazabal
Wilmer Machado as Benito
Marisela Buitriago as Lola Lopez
Raul Medina as Cabo Prudencio Reyes
Umberto Buonocuore as Gaetano di Fillipo
Yolanda Muñoz as Vicenta
Ivette Dominguez as Deisy Rodriguez
Geronimo Gomez as Abel Negron
Maria Eugenia Perera as Janet
Isabel Herrera as Pauchi
Elena Dinisio as Ingrid
Zoe Bolivar as Josefa Restrepo
Carmelo Lápira as Jairo Pastrana
Miguel David Díaz as Misael
Lucas Atilano as Washington David Negron (Abel Negron's son)
Sebastian Atilano as Jefferson José Negron (Abel Negron's son and Washington's brother)
Ledimar Sifuentes as Luz Clarita Camacho
Julio Pereira as Dr. Francisco

International Broadcast

This was the only Hispanic telenovela dubbed in English & Cebuano version in the Philippines, broadcast by Citynet Television (now named GTV) & GMA Cebu and Davao. In Citynet, it was dubbed in English through the trends of playing Japanese sci-fi TV series dubbed in English. After Ka Ina ended in Citynet as the first English-dubbed Hispanic telenovela in the said country, Citynet never borrowed any telenovela to be dubbed in English.

References

External links

Opening Credits

1995 telenovelas
Venevisión telenovelas
Venezuelan telenovelas
1995 Venezuelan television series debuts
1995 Venezuelan television series endings
Spanish-language telenovelas
Television shows set in Venezuela